Tomasz Winnicki (born November 17, 1975) is a Polish-Canadian white supremacist based in London, Ontario. He was the subject of complaints before the Canadian Human Rights Tribunal for his activities, and has also faced criminal charges on weapons offences. In July 2006, he was sentenced to nine months in prison for violating a Federal Court injunction barring him from posting hateful material on the Internet. In 2010, he ran unsuccessfully in the London mayoral election, garnering around 0.2% of the municipal vote.

Background
Winnicki and his family migrated to Italy from Poland in 1985, before migrating to Canada in 1987.

Internet activities and legal proceedings
Winnicki is a prolific poster on Alex Linder's Vanguard News Network web forum. Winnicki had previously posted using the username Thexder_3D, but later opted to post using his real name, after having been publicly identified. As a result of his online writings, Ottawa human rights lawyer Richard Warman filed a federal human rights complaint against Winnicki.  Winnicki was the subject of hearings before the Canadian Human Rights Tribunal in August and October 2005, with closing arguments heard on December 12, 2005.  Winnicki faced the possibility of a permanent cease and desist order, a penalty of up to $10,000 and damages of up to $60,000 for naming the complainant personally in the discriminatory material and attempting to retaliate against him for having filed the complaint.

The Federal Court of Canada issued an injunction against Winnicki on October 4, 2005, enjoining him from posting hate propaganda until the Canadian Human Rights Tribunal issues a decision in the case against him. The judge said: "Having looked at these messages in their entirety and in context, I have no doubt that they are likely to expose persons of the Jewish faith to hatred or contempt, as these concepts have been defined in Nealy, supra, and approved in Taylor, supra. And the same can be said of the messages which target persons of the black race. They are undoubtedly as vile as one can imagine and are not only discriminatory but threatening to the victims they target." He concluded by saying, "I have no hesitation in holding that the words complained of are so manifestly contrary to the letter and the spirit of s. 13 of the CHRA that any finding to the contrary would be considered highly suspect."

Winnicki was also the subject of contempt of court proceedings in Ottawa before the Federal Court, as he was alleged to have broken the injunction by continuing to post hate to the Internet.
In July 2006, Winnicki was sentenced to nine months' imprisonment by the Federal Court of Canada for disregarding the court order and continuing to spread "the unrelenting message of hatred" over the internet. Winnicki faced a second contempt for continuing to violate the Canadian Human Rights Tribunal's permanent cease and desist order of April 2006. After spending 83 days in jail, Winnicki was released in the fall of 2006, pending his appeal of the nine-month sentence that was handed down in July 2006 for contempt of court. The appeal was heard on January 16, 2007 and reduced his sentence to time served. Winnicki was criticized by some other white supremacists for employing a Chinese-Canadian lawyer, Chi-Kun Shi, to defend him before the Canadian Human Rights Tribunal.

In April 2006, the Tribunal released its ruling and fined Winnicki $6,000 for violating the Canadian Human Rights Act and ordered him to pay an additional $5,500 in damages to the complainant, Richard Warman. The Tribunal found that Winnnicki's internet postings were "vicious and dehumanizing" and ordered him to stop posting hateful messages on the internet.

Protests
In addition to his online activities, Winnicki has attended a number of political protests in London, Ontario, where he resides with his mother, and in other cities. In September 2004, Winnicki and three others were stopped by the police as they were driving to a Toronto rally in support of Holocaust denier Ernst Zündel. He was charged with carrying a concealed weapon, possessing weapons at a public meeting, and possession of a weapon for a dangerous purpose, after police found throwing knives, a bow and arrows, and body armour in his vehicle. Winnicki pleaded guilty to weapons charges on November 23, 2006, receiving a conditional discharge with 6 months of probation.

2010 mayoral candidacy
In October 2010, Winnicki stood as a candidate in the London mayoral election. The election was ultimately won by Joe Fontana, who received 47.2% of the votes cast; Winnicki gained around 0.2% of the vote.

References

External links
 Federal Court – reasons for injunction, dated November 7, 2005
 Federal Court – contempt of court judgment, dated July 12, 2006

Canadian neo-Nazis
Polish emigrants to Canada
People from London, Ontario
People convicted of hate crimes
Living people
1975 births